Gibberula achenea is a species of sea snail, a marine gastropod mollusk, in the family Cystiscidae.

References

achenea
Gastropods described in 1971
Cystiscidae